The 2016–17 LBA season, was the 95th season of the Lega Basket Serie A (LBA), known for sponsorship reasons as the Serie A PosteMobile, the highest-tier level professional basketball league in Italy. The regular season started on 2 October 2016 and finished on 7 May 2017, with the playoffs started on 12 May (dependent on an Italian club qualifying for the 2017 EuroLeague Final Four or for the 2017 Champions League Playoffs) and finished between 16 and 22 June depending on results.

As in previous years, Molten Corporation provided the official ball for all matches.

EA7 Emporio Armani Milano were the defending champions.

Umana Reyer Venezia won their 3rd title by beating Dolomiti Energia Trento in game 6 of the finals.

Teams

Promotion and relegation (pre-season)

A total of 16 teams will contest the league, including 15 sides from the 2015–16 season and one promoted from the 2015–16 Serie A2.

Germani Basket Brescia is the promoted club from the Serie A2 Citroën after beating Fortitudo Bologna at game 5 of league's playoffs, and returns in the highest-tier of the Italian basketball league system after 28 years of absence from Serie A.

Brescia replaced Virtus Bologna who was relegated during the previous season.

Number of teams by region

Notes
 2015–16 LBA champion.
 2015–16 Serie A2 champion.

Venues and locations

Personnel and sponsorship

1. On the back of shirt.
2. On the shorts.

Managerial Changes

Changes from 2015–16

New League's Title Sponsor
From the end of the 2015–16 season, Lega Basket Serie A has a new sponsor. The Turkish brand Beko left Serie A after four years of sponsorship.
Beko decided to focus just on their sponsorship of the Spanish football team Barcelona.

In December 2016, took place in Rome the assembly of Lega Basket during which the president Egidio Bianchi has communicated to all the clubs to have reached the multi-year agreement with PosteMobile, an Italy-based mobile virtual network operator owned by Poste italiane Group, that will become the Title Sponsor of the LBA.

Rules
Each team is allowed either five or seven foreign players under two formulas:
5 foreigners from countries outside the European Union
3 foreigners from countries outside the E.U., 4 foreigners from E.U. countries (also including those from countries signatory of the Cotonou Agreement)

Each club can choose the 5+5 formula, that consists of five Italian players and five foreign players, and the 3+4+5 formula, with five Italian players, three foreigners from countries outside the E.U. and four foreigners from E.U. countries or "Cotonou Countries".

At the end of the season there will be a prize of €500,000 for the top three ranked teams, that had chosen the 5+5 formula, considering the playing time of Italian players, and €200,000 for those teams that will obtain the best results with their youth sector.

Regular season
In the regular season, teams play against each other home-and-away in a round-robin format. The eight first qualified teams will advance to the Playoffs, the last seven qualified teams will be eliminated, while the last one qualified team will be relegated and replaced by the winner of the playoffs of the second-level Serie A2 Basket. The matchdays are from 2 October 2016 to 7 May 2017.

League table

Results

Positions by round
The table lists the positions of teams after completion of each round.

Updated to games played on 7 May 2017
Source: LBA

Playoffs

The LBA playoffs quarterfinals are best-of-five, while the semifinals and finals series are best-of-seven. The playoffs will start on 12 May 2017 to finish between 16 and 22 June depending on result.

Final standings

Individual statistics
As of 7 May 2017.

Points

Assists

Steals

Rebounds

Blocks

Valuation

Individual game highs

Updated: 16 May 2017. Source: LBA

Awards

Finals MVP
 Melvin Ejim (Umana Reyer Venezia)

Most Valuable Player
 Marcus Landry (Germani Basket Brescia)

Best Player Under 22
 Diego Flaccadori (Dolomiti Energia Trento)

Best Coach
 Vincenzo Esposito (The Flexx Pistoia)

Best Executive
 Giuseppe Sindoni (Betaland Capo d'Orlando)

Round MVP

Serie A clubs in European competitions

Source: EuroLeague Champions League

Supercup

The 2016 Italian Supercup was the 22nd edition of the super cup tournament of the Italian basketball. It opened the season on 24 and 25 September 2016. It was contested in Milan's Mediolanum Forum.

Qualified for the tournament were league winners and cup winners EA7 Emporio Armani Milano, cup finalists Sidigas Avellino, cup semifinalists Vanoli Cremona and league finalist Grissin Bon Reggio Emilia.

EA7 Emporio Armani Milano lifted the Supercup trophy by downing Sidigas Avellino 72-90. Krunoslav Simon led the winners with 25 points on 5-of-7 three-point shots. Ricky Hickman added 15 while Zoran Dragić had 11 for Milan. Hickman had 9 points in the second quarter to make Milan get a double-digit lead, 34-44, at halftime. Dragić, Simon and Davide Pascolo allowed Milan to extend their margin to 51-67 after 30 minutes, enough to control the game until the final buzzer and lift its first Supercup trophy.

Cup

The 49th edition of the Italian Cup, knows as the PosteMobile Final Eight for sponsorship reasons, was contested between 16 and 19 February 2017 in Rimini. Eight teams qualified for the Final Eight were the best ranked teams at the end of the first stage of the 2016–17 Serie A season.

EA7 Emporio Armani Milano rallied to beat Grissin Bon Reggio Emilia 84-87 and reach the finals. In Sunday's final, Milan will play Banco di Sardegna Sassari which downed Germani Basket Brescia 77-70.

EA7 Emporio Armani Milano successfully defended the Italian Cup with an 84-74 come-from-behind win over Banco di Sardegna Sassari in the final on Sunday. Ricky Hickman made 5 of 7 shots from downtown en route to 25 points, Rakim Sanders scored 15 points and Milan Mačvan added 11 for the winners. Sassari took charge from the start with a 2-13 run and led 11-19 after 10 minutes. A Josh Carter triple made it 15-25 midway through the second quarter, but Sanders heated up as Milan fought back and Hickman's triple to end the half drew Milan within 34-36. A three by Sanders to open the second half gave Milan its first lead. Hickman netted another three and Davide Pascolo converted a three-point play to boost the margin to 46-40. Andrea Cinciarini further extended the margin to 9 before strong play by Gani Lawal sparked a Sassari comeback. A David Bell jumper made it 56-54 through three quarters. It was still a 2-point game four minutes into the fourth quarter when Hickman and Macvan combined for all Milan's points in an 11-2 march to take a 75-64 advantage with 3:38 remaining. Sassari raced back with 8 straight points, but was held to a single basket over the final two minutes as Milan closed out the game from the line. Trevor Lacey paced Sassari with 15 points, Lawal scored 13 and Rok Stipčević 11.

Ricky Hickman was named Finals MVP of the competition.

References

External links
 Lega Basket website  Retrieved 14 June 2016

Lega Basket Serie A seasons
Italian
1